The 2022 FIBA U18 Women's European Championship was the 37th edition of the Women's European basketball championship for national under-18 teams. It was played from 6 to 14 August 2022 in Heraklion, Greece. Lithuania women's national under-18 basketball team won the tournament and became the European champions for the second time.

Venues

Participating teams
After the 2022 Russian invasion of Ukraine, both Russia and Belarus were expelled from the competition. They were replaced by Bosnia and Herzegovina, 14th in the 2019 Division A edition and Sweden, 4th in the 2019 Division B edition

 
 
 
 
   (Winners, 2019 FIBA U18 Women's European Championship Division B)
 
 
   (Runners-up, 2019 FIBA U18 Women's European Championship Division B)
 
 
 
 
 
 
 
 
   (Fourth place, 2019 FIBA U18 Women's European Championship Division B)
   (Third place, 2019 FIBA U18 Women's European Championship Division B)

First round
The draw of the first round was held on 15 February 2022 in Freising, Germany.

In the first round, the teams were drawn into four groups of four. All teams advance to the playoffs.

Group A

Group B

Group C

Group D

Playoffs

Main bracket

5th place bracket

9th place bracket

13th place bracket

Final standings

References

2022
2022–23 in European women's basketball
International youth basketball competitions hosted by Greece
FIBA U18
August 2022 sports events in Greece
Sport in Heraklion